American singer Bing Crosby has released 71 studio albums, 83 compilation albums and 409 singles over the course of his career. Crosby is one of the world's best-selling music artists, having sold more than 200 million records as of 1960 according to different sources his sales could be 300 million, or even 500 million records, tapes, compact discs and digital downloads globally. Guinness World Records recognizes "White Christmas" as the best-selling single of all time, selling 50 million copies globally.

Crosby was an influence on multimedia stars that followed, including Elvis Presley. Musically, Crosby set the benchmark for the intimate "easy listening" genre that influenced future male artists including Frank Sinatra, Dean Martin, Perry Como, and Dick Haymes. He first started recording in 1926 with Don Clark and his Hotel Biltmore Orchestra, when he sang the vocal refrain on "I've Got the Girl". He joined the Paul Whiteman Orchestra in 1927 which led to his first screen appearance as a member of the trio The Rhythm Boys in King of Jazz.  
 
He released his first album containing compilations in 1939, and his first studio album Ballad for Americans, (which contained no re-issued singles) in 1940. His final album Beautiful Memories was recorded in 1976; however, material recorded before his death was issued posthumously in 1977 as the album Seasons. Crosby recorded with numerous artists, including Al Jolson, his fellow film stars Judy Garland and Bob Hope, and The Andrews Sisters.

Albums

Posthumous releases and compilations

Singles

Pre-Decca era

Decca and beyond

Holiday 100 chart entries
Since many radio stations in the US adopt a format change to Christmas music each December, many holiday hits have an annual spike in popularity during the last few weeks of the year and are retired once the season is over. In December 2011, Billboard began a Holiday Songs chart with 50 positions that monitors the last five weeks of each year to "rank the top holiday hits of all eras using the same methodology as the Hot 100, blending streaming, airplay, and sales data", and in 2013 the number of positions on the chart was doubled, resulting in the Holiday 100. Many Crosby recordings have made appearances on the Holiday 100 and are noted below according to the holiday season in which they charted there.

Notes

References

Discography
Pop music discographies
Discographies of American artists